Martyrs' Cemetery is a cemetery in Fallujah, Iraq.

Martyrs' Cemetery may also refer to:
 Martyrs' Cemetery (Korçë), Albania
 Revolutionary Martyrs' Cemetery, North Korea
 Babaoshan Revolutionary Cemetery, China
 Trường Sơn Cemetery, also known as Trường Sơn Martyrs' Cemetery, Vietnam
Martyrs' Cemetery, Kobanî